Jarrett is an unincorporated community in Wabasha County, Minnesota, United States.

Geography
The community is located between Hammond and Millville along Wabasha County Road 11 near the intersection with 334th Avenue.  Jarrett is located within Hyde Park Township and Zumbro Township. Silver Spring Creek and the Zumbro River meet at Jarrett. Other nearby communities include Millville, Hammond, Zumbro Falls, Potsdam, and South Troy.

History
A post office called Jarretts was established in 1879, and remained in operation until 1919. The community took its name from Jarrett's Ford, a shallow crossing over the Zumbro River.

References

Unincorporated communities in Minnesota
Unincorporated communities in Wabasha County, Minnesota
Rochester metropolitan area, Minnesota